The 1974 Stanford Cardinals football team represented Stanford University in the Pacific-8 Conference during the 1974 NCAA Division I football season. Led by third-year head coach Jack Christiansen, the Cardinals were 5–4–2 overall (5–1–1 in Pac-8, second) and played home games on campus at Stanford Stadium in Stanford, California.

Schedule

References

External links
 Game program: Stanford at Washington State – October 26, 1974

Stanford
Stanford Cardinal football seasons
Stanford Cardinals football